Taldangra Assembly constituency is an assembly constituency in Bankura district in the Indian state of West Bengal.

Overview
As per orders of the Delimitation Commission, No. 251 Taldangra Assembly constituency is composed of the following: Bibarda, Fulmati, Harmasra, Khalgram, Panchmura and Taldangra gram panchayats of Taldangra community development block; Brojarajpur and Gaurbazar gram panchayats of Indpur community development block; and Simlapal community development block.

Taldangra Assembly constituency  is part of No. 36 Bankura (Lok Sabha constituency).

Election results

2016
In the 2016 state assembly elections, Samir Chakraborty of All India Trinamool Congress won the Taldangra assembly seat defeating his nearest rivals Amia Patra of CPI(M).

2011

.# Swing calculated on Congress+Trinamool Congress vote percentages taken together in 2006.

1977-2006
In the 2006, 2001 and 1996 state assembly elections, Manoranjan Patra of CPI(M) won the Taldangra assembly seat defeating his nearest rivals Manik Mitra of Trinamool Congress, Dilip Panda of Trinamool Congress and Debaprasad Singha Barathakur of Congress, respectively. Contests in most years were multi cornered but only winners and runners are being mentioned. Amiya Patra of CPI(M) defeated Phani Bhusan Singhababu of Congress in 1991 and Amit Chatterjee of Congress in 1987. Mohini Mohan Panda of CPI(M) defeated Kalyani Prasad Singha Choudhury of Congress in 1982 and Phani Bhusan Singhababu of Congress in 1977.

1952-1972
Phani Bhusan Singhababu of Congress won in 1972. Mohini Mohan Panda of CPI(M) won in 1971 and 1969. Purabi Mukhopadhyay of Congress won in 1967 and 1962. In 1957 there was no seat at Taldangra. Purabi Mukhopadhyay of Congress won the Taldangra seat in independent India's first election in 1952.

References

Assembly constituencies of West Bengal
Politics of Bankura district